Max Mayer may refer to

 Max Mayer (engineer), German engineer
 Max Mayer (filmmaker), American filmmaker
 Max Mayer (footballer), Swiss footballer

See also
 Max Meyer, a disambiguation page
 Max Meier (born 1936), Swiss boxer